Finsch's euphonia (Euphonia finschi) is a species of bird in the family Fringillidae.
It is found in northern Brazil, French Guiana, Guyana, Suriname and eastern Venezuela.
Its natural habitats are subtropical or tropical moist lowland forest and heavily degraded former forest.

The common name and scientific name commemorate the German ethnographer, naturalist and colonial explorer Friedrich Hermann Otto Finsch  (8 August 1839 - 31 January 1917, Braunschweig).

References

Finsch's euphonia
Birds of the Guianas
Finsch's euphonia
Finsch's euphonia
Finsch's euphonia
Taxonomy articles created by Polbot